Bagh Stallions is a franchise cricket team that represents Bagh in the Kashmir Premier League. Umar Amin is the captain and Abdul Rehman is the coach of the team. Rumman Raees was announced as vice-captain. Kamran Akmal was announced as Bagh Stallions’ icon player.

Squad

Season standings

Points table

League fixtures and results

Playoffs

Qualifier

Eliminator 2

Final

Statistics

Most runs 

Source: Cricinfo

Most wickets 

Source: Cricinfo

References

Kashmir Premier League (Pakistan)